Municipal Stadium, or Waco Municipal Stadium and formerly Waco Stadium, is an athletics stadium located in Waco, Texas at S 15th Street and Dutton Avenue. It was formerly the home field of Baylor University's athletic teams  from the time shortly after the stadium was built in 1936 until 1949. For the Bears, the new off-campus facility replaced the smaller Carroll Field as the home football game location, where they had played from 1930 to 1935. Waco Stadium was renamed Municipal Stadium in 1942. Baylor did not play there in 1943 or 1944 due to World War II. Baylor's track teams used the stadium into the 1950s.

Today the original grandstands are gone, replaced by a single side seating area, but track and playing field remains.

References

External links
 Doak Walker: Inspiration for Baylor's post-war stadium?, Baylor University.

Defunct college football venues
Baylor Bears football venues
Sports venues in Waco, Texas
American football venues in Texas
Sports venues completed in 1936
1936 establishments in Texas
College track and field venues in the United States
Athletics (track and field) venues in Texas